Lamba Kheda is a village in the Bhopal district of Madhya Pradesh, India. It is located in the Huzur tehsil.

History 

Lamba kheda was named after Dr. Prithvi Singh Lamba. This area was given to Dr. Lamba by the government of Madhya Pradesh when he was posted in Bhopal. When Lamba donated this area, it was named after him, and became a village.

Education 
The Jai Narain College of Technology is located in New Chouksey Nagar, Lamba Kheda.

Demographics 

According to the 2011 census of India, Lamba Kheda has 806 households. The effective literacy rate (i.e. the literacy rate of population excluding children aged 6 and below) is 81.38%.

References 

Villages in Huzur tehsil